Boży Dar may refer to the following places:
Boży Dar, Lublin County in Lublin Voivodeship (east Poland)
Boży Dar, Zamość County in Lublin Voivodeship (east Poland)
Boży Dar, Masovian Voivodeship (east-central Poland)